Ilmar Pärtelpoeg (born 24 December 1926 Tallinn) is an Estonian politician. He was a member of VII Riigikogu.

References

1926 births
Members of the Riigikogu, 1992–1995
Estonian male ski jumpers
Estonian computer scientists
2013 deaths